Bob Kruse (born February 10, 1942) is a former American football guard and tackle. He played for the Oakland Raiders from 1967 to 1968 and for the Buffalo Bills in 1969.

References

1942 births
Living people
American football guards
American football tackles
Colorado State Rams football players
Wayne State Wildcats football players
Oakland Raiders players
Buffalo Bills players